Jedd Gardner (born July 22, 1988, in Niagara Falls, Ontario) is a Canadian football wide receiver for the Guelph Gryphons. He was selected to compete in the East–West bowl and in the 2011 CFL combine. He was drafted 28th overall by the Toronto Argonauts of the Canadian Football League in the 2011 CFL Draft and signed with the team on May 31, 2011. After being released following the 2011 training camp, Gardner was sent to play for Team Canada in the IFAF World Cup Tournament and after returned to play out his final year at Guelph. During his college career Gardner posted some impressive numbers 152 receptions for 2515 yards and 15 touchdowns. He also added 200 rushing yards and 2 touchdowns. In the return game Gardner posted 989 punt returns yards on 17 attempts for an amazing 58.18 yards/return with 4 touchdowns. As a kick returner he tallied 570 yards and 1 touchdown. Gardner also holds the 3 of the longest plays in CIS history at 129 yards, 128 yards, and 125 yards.

References 

1988 births
Living people
Sportspeople from Niagara Falls, Ontario
Players of Canadian football from Ontario
Canadian football wide receivers
Guelph Gryphons football players
Toronto Argonauts players